Cristian Stelian Fenici   (born 13 February 1986) is a Romanian handballer who plays for as a centre back for SCM Politehnica Timișoara and the Romania national team.

Individual awards 
 Romanian Liga Națională Best Romanian Player: 2015
 Prosport All-Star Centre Back of the Romanian Liga Națională: 2018 
 Gala Premiilor Handbalului Românesc Liga Națională Centre Back of the Season: 2019

References

1986 births
Living people
Sportspeople from Timișoara
Romanian male handball players